Oto Kanno (born 30 October 2000) is a Japanese professional footballer who plays as a midfielder for WE League club Tokyo Verdy Beleza.

Club career 
Kanno made her WE League debut on 12 September 2021.

References 

Living people
2000 births
Japanese women's footballers
Nippon TV Tokyo Verdy Beleza players
Women's association football midfielders
Association football people from Tokyo
WE League players